Danilo Anđušić (born 22 April 1991) is a Serbian professional basketball player for Partizan Belgrade of the Serbian KLS, the Adriatic League and the EuroLeague. He has also represented the Serbian national basketball team in international competition.

Professional career
Anđušić joined Hemofarm youth academy at the age of 15. In 2009, Anđušić signed his first professional contract with Hemofarm, but was immediately loaned to Mega Vizura for the 2009–10 season. In March 2010, after the end of the Basketball League of Serbia first phase, Anđušić returned to Hemofarm. On 16 June 2010, in the second game of the playoff final, Anđušić was involved in the brawl against Partizan. In the 2010–11 season, he also played for Hemofarm.

In September 2011, Anđušić officially moved to Partizan, signing a four-year contract. In December 2012, Anđušić requested contract termination from the team, unsatisfied with the playing role and little playing time over the season.  On 28 December 2012, Anđušić and Partizan agreed to part ways.

On February 13, 2013, he signed a four-year deal with Virtus Bologna. In October 2013, he was loaned to CB Valladolid for the 2013–14 season. In August 2014, he signed a two-year deal with Bilbao Basket. In July 2015, he parted ways with Bilbao.

On October 14, 2015, Anđušić signed with Partizan until January, returning to the club for a second stint. He also has an option to extend until the end of the season. Following the expiration of his contract, on December 30, 2015, he parted ways with the club. On January 5, 2016, he signed with the Polish club Anwil Włocławek for the rest of the season.

On September 17, 2016, Anđušić signed a one-year deal with the Russian team Parma Basket. He appeared in 15 games of the 2016–17 VTB United League season with Parma, averaging 19.8 points, 3.8 rebounds and 3.7 assists. On February 7, 2017, he left Parma and signed a deal with UNICS Kazan until the end of 2017–18 season. In 6 games he played with UNICS in the VTB United League until the end of the season he averaged 6.3 points and 1.5 assists, while in the 2016–17 EuroLeague, he appeared in 8 games, averaging 5 points, 1.4 rebounds and 1 assist per game.

In 2017–18 season, his role in UNICS dropped as he made only 5 appearances in the 2017–18 VTB United League season and averaged only 2.2 points per game.

In November 2018, Anđušić a contract with the Bosnian team Igokea. Over 15 ABA League games, he averaged 11.3 points, 2.5 rebounds and 1.8 assists, while shooting 39.4% from the field.

On September 25, 2019, he signed a contract with the French team JL Bourg of LNB Pro A. On September 29, he debuted for the team and scored 31 points in win over Élan Béarnais.

On July 6, 2021, Anđušić signed with AS Monaco of the French LNB Pro A and the EuroLeague. On June 28, 2022, he parted ways with the French club.

On June 30, 2022, he returned to Partizan for a third stint with the Serbian powerhouse.

Serbian national team
Anđušić played with the senior men's Serbian national basketball team at the EuroBasket 2013.

Personal life
In 2015, he married Serbian sport shooter Ivana Maksimović.

Career statistics

EuroLeague

|-
| style="text-align:left;"| 2011–12
| style="text-align:left;" rowspan=2 | Partizan
| 10 || 0 || 7.6 || .292 || .227 || .875 || .7 || .4 || .2 || .0 || 3.3 || 2.6
|-
| style="text-align:left;"| 2012–13
| 7 || 0 || 7.9 || .261 || .143 || 1.000 || .6 || .7 || .3 || .0 || 2.3 || 1.0
|-
| style="text-align:left;"| 2016–17
| style="text-align:left;"| UNICS Kazan
| 8 || 1 || 15.1 || .361 || .316 || .727 || 1.4 || 1.0 || .5 || .0 || 5.0 || 2.5
|- class="sortbottom"
| colspan=2 style="text-align:center;"| Career
| 25 || 1 || 10.1 || .313 || .236 || .828 || .9 || .7 || .3 || .0 || 3.6 || 2.1

See also 
 List of Serbia men's national basketball team players

References

External links
 Danilo Anđušić at aba-liga.com
 Danilo Anđušić at acb.com
 Danilo Anđušić at euroleague.net
 Danilo Anđušić at fiba.com
 Danilo Anđušić at lnb.fr
 

1991 births
Living people
ABA League players
AS Monaco Basket players
Basketball League of Serbia players
Basketball players from Belgrade
BC UNICS players
Bilbao Basket players
CB Valladolid players
KK Hemofarm players
KK Igokea players
KK Mega Basket players
KK Partizan players
KK Włocławek players
JL Bourg-en-Bresse players
Lega Basket Serie A players
Liga ACB players
Parma Basket players
Serbia men's national basketball team players
Serbian expatriate basketball people in Bosnia and Herzegovina
Serbian expatriate basketball people in France
Serbian expatriate basketball people in Italy
Serbian expatriate basketball people in Monaco
Serbian expatriate basketball people in Poland
Serbian expatriate basketball people in Russia
Serbian expatriate basketball people in Spain
Serbian men's basketball players
Shooting guards
Virtus Bologna players